The World Architecture Festival (WAF) is an annual festival and awards ceremony, one of the most prestigious events dedicated to the architecture and development industry. The first four events were held in Barcelona, from 2008 to 2011, at which point the festival moved to Singapore for four years. Since 2016, host cities have included Berlin and Amsterdam. It is the only event where around 550 shortlisted architects present their projects live in crit rooms to a judging panel. One of these projects is awarded the World Building of the Year title. Each year the World Architecture Festival publishes a list of the winners of the awards on their official website.

History 
The World Architecture Festival was first held in 2008 as a "festival and live awards competition dedicated to celebrating and sharing architectural excellence from across the globe." The first four festivals were held in Barcelona; since 2012 the annual events have been hosted by Singapore, Berlin, and Amsterdam. Over a thousand projects are entered in the competition for the awards and more than 550 of these are shortlisted for live presentation at the festival. The architects pay a submission fee to enter a Future Project or a Completed Building project and travel to where the festival is arranged to present the shortlisted project live to a jury panel. The entries are voluntary and the festival does not control who submits projects. In 2011, the sister event INSIDE Festival (for interior architecture and design) was added in the same venue and arranged at the same time as WAF.

Winners

The 2008 festival 

The World Architecture Festival was held for the first time on 22–24 October 2008 in Barcelona. Its programme director was Paul Finch. An important part of the festival was the awards programme. The competition was open to building completed within the past 18 months, between January 1, 2007 and June 20, 2008. There were 722 entries competing in 17 categories, comprising 96 building types from 63 countries. After a preselection, 224 projects from 43 countries have been shortlisted. All the shortlisted architects presented their work during the festival and the winners competed for the top award, the World Building of the Year. The judging panel was headed by Norman Foster and included Stefan Behnisch, Robert Stern and Zaha Hadid among the 40 architects on the panel. 1,900 visitors from 70 countries attended the festival.

In 2008, the World Building of the Year was awarded to: Bocconi University, Italy (by Grafton Architects).

Gallery of some of the 2008 winners

The 2009 festival 
The second World Architecture Festival took place in Barcelona at the Centre Convencions International Barcelona (CCIB) on November 4 to 6 2009. Projects from 67 countries participated in the competition. 272 projects were shortlisted, in 15 categories.
A jury of architects and industry figures from around the world judged the competition's 45 Awards. The winners of the 15 categories of completed buildings competed for the Building of the Year Award. In addition to the categories from the 2008 festival three new sections were added: Interiors and Fit-out, Structural Design and Future Projects.
In 2009, 1,507 architects from 71 countries came to Barcelona for the festival.

Awards 2009
World Building of the Year (Category: Culture, Completed Buildings ) Mapungubwe Interpretation Center in South Africa by Peter Rich Architects
Future Project of the Year (Category: Cultural, Future Projects )  Spanish Pavilion for 2010 Expo Shanghai in China by Miralles Tagliabue EMBT
Interiors and Fit Out Overall Winner (Category: Interiors and Fit Out - Retail (small) )  Corian Super-Surfaces Showroom in Italy, Milano by Architect Amanda Levete Architects
Structural Design of the Year (Category: Structural Design - Spans (e.g. bridges, stadiums, big sheds) ) Arena Zagreb in Croatia, by Zagrebby Architect UPI-2M
Student design competition (Category: Student design competition: Distressed Cities, Creative Responses ) AECOM Design + Planning Urban SOS in India, Mumbai by Sabrina Kleinenhammans, a graduate at MIT

Gallery of some of the 2009 winners

The 2010 festival 

The third World Architecture festival took place in Barcelona at the CCIB Forum (Centro de Convenciones Internacionales de Barcelona) November 3 to 5 2010. The festival was the largest and most comprehensive of its kind in 2010. More than 500 entries from 65 countries competed in 15 main categories and in over 20 further sections. The festival had 5 awards sections, 42 categories and more than 100 types of buildings. The competition was open for entries on April 2 to July 9 and the shortlist was announced in late August. The shortlisted projects were presented at the festival.

Awards 2010
World Building of the Year and winner of category culture (Category: Culture ) MAXXI, National Museum of XXI Century Arts in Italy, Rome by Zaha Hadid Architects
Future Project of the Year (Category: Masterplanning, Future Projects ) The Arc in Palestinian Territory, Occupied by Suisman Urban Design
Interiors and Fit Out Overall Winner (Category: Interiors and Fit Out - Offices ) ANZ Centre in Australia, Melbourne by Hassell
Structural Design of the Year (Category: Structural Design - Glass (where used structurally) ) Medieval & Renaissance Galleries in United Kingdom, London by MUMA
Student design competition (Category: Student design competition: Campus Catalyst Project AECOM Design + Planning Urban SOSin Haiti, Port-au-Prince by Robin Bankert, Michael Murphy, Robin Bankert, Michael Murphy, Caroline Shannon and Joseph Wilfong, University of Harvard
The Art and Work Award for Buildings Designed to Display Art (Category: Structural Design - Glass (where used structurally) ) Medieval & Renaissance Galleries in United Kingdom, London by MUMA
ONCE Foundation Award for Accessibility (Two joint winners) (Category: Sport ) Aviva Stadium in Ireland, Dublinby Populous in association with Scott Tallon Walker
ONCE Foundation Award for Accessibility (Two joint winners) (Category: Civic and community, Health) West Vancouver Community Centre in Canada, West Vancouver by Hughes Condon Marler Architects

Gallery of some of the 2010 winners

The 2011 festival 

The fourth World Architecture Festival (WAF) was held in Barcelona from November 2 to 4, 2011, at Centre de Convencions Internacional de Catalunya. More than 700 projects were entered for the competition. More than 1,300 people attended the awards ceremony. The competition opened for entries on April 1 and closed on June 30, 2011.
In 2011 Michael Sorkin, Ben van Berkel, Jo Noero, Odile Decq and Professor Kongjian Yu, and Tim MacFarlane were members of the jury.
The opening night was held inMedia-ICT (by Cloud 9) which was later to win the World Building of the Year Award. The World Building of the Year was elected from the 16 completed buildings winning their category.

Awards 2011
World Building of the Year (Category: Office (inc mixed use) ) Media-ICT in Spain, Barcelona by Cloud 9
Future Project of the Year (Category: Infrastructure, Future Projects ) Hanimaadhoo International Airport in Maldives by Integrated Design Associates Limited
Structural Design of the Year (Category: Structural Design - Towers ) Eight Spruce Street in United States of America by Gehry Partners, LLP
ONCE Foundation Award for Accessibility (Category: Culture ) Museum of Memory and Tolerance in Mexico, Mexico City by Arditti+RDT/arquitectos
People's Choice Award, by OpenBuildings (Category: Culture ) Memorial house Todor Proeski in Macedonia, Krushevoby Syndicate studio

Gallery of some of the 2011 winners

The 2012 festival 

The fifth World Architecture Festival (WAF) was moved to Singapore at Marina Bay Sands and was held from October 3 to 5 2012. The festival awards was nicknamed «The Architectural Oscars» at the time. The World Architecture Festival was at the time the world's largest global architectural awards programme. Paul Finch was director of the festival.
There were over 700 entries from more than 60 countries. Awards were given in 33 categories and 301 entries were shortlisted.
The competing projects were judged after a presentation during the festival.
In the jury choosing the World Building of the Year 2012 were Ben van Berkel, Moshe Safdie, Mok Wei Wei, Jürgen Mayer, Yvonne Farrell, Peter Cook, Kenzo Tange, Sou Fujimoto, Jeanne Gang, Dietrich Ebermarle and Charles Jencks among others.
Over 1800 architects, designers and press from more than 60 countries attended.
There was some criticism of the list of speakers being white, male, over 40 since of the 44 speakers on the festival 4 were women and 9 Asians.

Awards 2012

World Building of the Year (Category: Display ) Cooled Conservatories at Gardens by the Bay in Republic of Singapore by Wilkinson Eyre Architects
Future Project of the Year, Landscape (Category: Landscape (Projects), urban (Completed designs) ) Kallang River Bishan Park in Republic of Singapore by Atelier Dreiseitl
Future Project of the Year (Category: Masterplanning ) Msheireb - Heart of Doha in Doha, Qatar by AECOM, London (UK), Adjaye Associates (UK), Allies and Morrison (UK), Eric Party Architects (UK), Gensler (USA), HOK (USA), John McAslan and Partners (UK), Mangera Yvars Architects (UK), Mossessian & Partners (UK), Squire & Partners (UK)
Student Team of the Year (Category: Student Team of the Year) In the Core of Renaissance Architecture by Daniele Pronestì, Daniele Petralia, Stefano Nastasi - University of Ferrara (IT)
Director's Prize (Category: New and Old ) Plaza España in Adeje in Spain, Tenerife by Menis Arquitectos SLP
Small Project Award (Category: Transport ) Marina Bay station in Republic of Singapore by Aedas, Quarry Bay & Aedas Pte Ltd (Station Architect)
Small Project Award (Category: Office ) Office for an Advertising Film Production Company in India, Bangalore by SJK Architects

Gallery of some of the 2012 winners

The 2013 festival 
The sixth annual WAF was held in Singapore at Marina Bay Sands from 2 to 4 October 2013. It was attended by over 2,100 architects and designers from 68 countries. WAF was collocated with INSIDE World Festival of Interiors. The entries competed in 29 award categories across three category groups of completed buildings, landscape projects and future projects:
Completed Buildings: Civic and community, Culture, Display, Health, Higher education/research, Hotel/leisure, House, Housing, New and Old, Office, Production/energy/recycling, Religion, Schools, Shopping, Sport, Transport and Villa.
Landscape Projects: Completed designs - urban.
Future Projects: Commercial mixed-use, Competition entries, Culture, Education, Experimental, Health, House, Infrastructure, Leisure led development, Masterplanning, Office and Residential.

More than 300 projects from 50 countries made the official 2013 shortlist.
The festival's organiser's were i2i Events Group.

The super-jury included Ken Yeang, Patrick Bellew, Jeanne Gang, Dietmar Eberle and Ken Tadashi Oshima.

Awards 2013

World Building of the Year (Categories: Culture, Culture - Galleries)  Auckland Art Gallery  in New Zealand by Francis-Jones Morehen Thorp, fjmt + Archimedia - Architects in Association. 
Future Project of the Year (Categories: Future projects competition and Future projects culture)  National Maritime Museum of China  by Cox Rayner Architects.
 INSIDE World Interior of the Year: Carrer Avinyó, Barcelona, Spain by David Kohn Architects

Gallery of some of the 2013 winners

The 2014 festival 
The seventh annual WAF was held in Singapore at Marina Bay Sands from 1 to 3 October 2014. The event had more than 2000 attendees.

Awards 2014

World Building of the Year Winner: the Chapel / Vietnam / a21studio
Completed Buildings:
House (sponsored by Grohe) House for Trees / Vietnam /  Vo Trong Nghia Architects
Housing (sponsored by Grohe) The Carve / Norway / A-Lab
Office: Liberty Place / Australia / Francis-Jones Morehen Thorp
Higher Education & Research: Dalarna Media Library / Sweden / ADEPT
Display: Te Kaitaka 'The Cloak' / New Zealand / Fearon Hay Architects
Schools: Chobham Academy / UK/ Allford Hall Monaghan Morris
Shopping: Yalikavak Marina Complex / Turkey / EAA-Emre Arolat Architects
Religion: La Ascension del Señor Church / Spain / AGi architects
New and Old: Rethinking the Split House / China / Neri&Hu Design and Research Office
Civic & Community: the Chapel / Vietnam / a21studio
Culture: Danish Maritime Museum / Denmark / BIG - Bjarke Ingels Group
Hotel and Leisure: Son La Restaurant / Vietnam /  Vo Trong Nghia Architects
Villa: Dune House / New Zealand / Fearon Hay Architects
Production Energy and Recycling: Lune de Sang Sheds / Australia / CHROFI
Sport: Singapore Sports Hub / Singapore / Singapore Sports Hub Design Team
Transport: Scale Lane Bridge / UK / McDowell+Benedetti

The 2015 festival 
The eight annual WAF was held in Singapore at Suntec Convention & Exhibition Centre from 4 to 6 November 2015.
 World Building of the Year: The Interlace, by Office for Metropolitan Architecture
 Future Project of the Year: Vancouver House, by Bjarke Ingels Group
 Landscape of the Year: Yanweizhou Park
 Small Project Prize: Lidingövallen
 AkzoNobel's Prize for Colour in Exterior Architecture: ONS INCEK Showroom & Sales Office
 Student Charrette Winner: School of Planning and Architecture, Bhopal
 Religion Winner: Qatar Faculty of Islamic Studies, Education City, Doha by Mangera Yvars Architects

The 2016 festival 
The ninth annual WAF was held in Berlin, Germany from 16 to 18 November 2016.
 World Building of the Year: National Museum in Szczecin - Dialogue Centre Przełomy, Szczecin, Poland by KWK Promes
 INSIDE World Interior of the Year: Black Cant System - Heike fashion brand concept store, Hangzhou, China by AN Design
 Future Project of the Year: South Melbourne Primary School, Melbourne, Australia by Hayball
 Landscape of the Year: Kopupaka Reserve, Auckland, New Zealand by Isthmus
 Small Project of the Year: The Chinese University of Hong Kong School of Architecture, ZCB Bamboo Pavilion, Kowloon Bay, Hong Kong
 Civic and Community Award: The Library at Willesden Green

The 2017 festival 
The tenth annual WAF was held in Berlin, Germany from 15 to 17 November 2017.
 World Building of the Year: Chinese University of Hong Kong, Post-earthquake reconstruction/demonstration project of Guangming Village, Zhaotong, China 
INSIDE World Interior of the Year: Produce.Workshop, Fabricwood, Singapore
Future Project of the Year: Allen Jack+Cottier Architects and NH Architecture, Sydney Fish Markets, Sydney, Australia 
Landscape of the Year: Turenscape, Peasants and their Land: The Recovered Archaeological Landscape of Chengtoushan, Lixian County, China
Small Project of the Year: Eriksson Furunes + Leandro V. Locsin Partners + Jago Boase, Streetlight Tagpuro, Tacloban, Philippines
Completed Buildings:
House: Vo Trong Nghia Architects, Binh House, Ho Chi Minh City, Vietnam
Housing: Marc Koehler Architects, Superlofts Houthaven, Amsterdam, Netherlands 
Production, Energy & Recycling: Slash Architects and Arkizon Architects, The Farm of 38-30, Afyonkarahisar, Turkey 
Sport: HKS, U.S. Bank Stadium, Minneapolis, United States of America 
School: Andrew Burges Architects, East Sydney Early Learning Centre, Sydney, Australia
Civic & Community: Eriksson Furunes + Leandro V. Locsin Partners + Jago Boase, Streetlight Tagpuro, Tacloban, Philippines 
Culture: Heneghan Peng Architects, The Palestinian Museum, Birzeit, Palestine
Office: Nikken Sekkei, Co Op Kyosai Plaza, Tokyo, Japan 
New & Old: The Chinese University of Hong Kong, Post-earthquake reconstruction/demonstration project of Guangming Village, Zhaotong, China 
Display: Alison Brooks Architects, The Smile, London, United Kingdom
Transport: Grüntuch Ernst Architects, Transformation Chemnitz Central Station, Chemnitz, Germany
Hotel & Leisure: Cong Sinh Architects, Vegetable Trellis, Ho Chi Minh City, Vietnam 
Shopping: ACME, Victoria Gate, Leeds, United Kingdom
Health: Ntsika Architects, Westbury Clinic, Johannesburg, South Africa 
Mixed Use: Allford Hall Monaghan Morris, Westminster Bridge Road, London, United Kingdom
Religion: Waugh Thistleton Architects, Bushey Cemetery, Bushey, United Kingdom 
Higher Education & Research: C.F. Møller Architects, Maersk Tower, Copenhagen, Denmark 
Villa: Irving Smith Architects, Bach with Two Roofs, Golden Bay, New Zealand

The 2018 festival 
The eleventh annual WAF was held in Amsterdam, Netherlands from 28 to 30 November 2018.

 World Building of the Year: WOHA Architects - Kampung Admiralty, Singapore, Singapore
 Future Project of the Year: Sebastian Monsalve + Juan David Hoyos - Medellin River Parks / Botanical Park Master Plan, Medellin, Colombia
 INSIDE World Interior of the Year: JAC studios - Yumin Art Nouveau Collection, Phoenix Jeju, South Korea
 Landscape of the Year: Batlle i Roig Arquitectura - Pedestrian Path along the Gypsum Mines, Barcelona, Spain
 Small Project of the Year: Camilo Moraes - Piedras Bayas Beachcamp / Atacama Desert, Chile
 The Amsterdam Prize: Benthem Crouwel Architects - North South Line / Amsterdam, Netherlands
 Glass Future Prize: Studio Gang - Tour Montparnasse, Paris, France
 Completed Buildings:
 House: David Leech Architects - A house in a garden - 81 Hollybrook Grove, Dublin, Ireland
 Small Scale Housing: Allford Hall Monaghan Morris - Weston Street, London, United Kingdom Completed Buildings
 Large Scale Housing: SANJAY PURI ARCHITECTS - The Street, Mathura, India
 Production, Energy & Recycling: Parviainen Architects - Länsisalmi Power Station, Vantaa, Finland
 Sport: Koffi & Diabaté Architectes - Gymnasium, Blaise Pascal High School, Abidjan, Ivory Coast
 School: Tezuka Architects - Muku Nursery School - Fuji City, Japan
 Civic & Community: CHROFI with McGregor Coxall - Maitland Riverlink, Maitland, Australia
 Culture: Conrad Gargett - The Piano Mill, Stanthorpe, Australia
 Office: INNOCAD Architecture - C&P Corporate Headquarters, Graz, Austria
 New & Old: Heatherwick Studio - Zeitz MOCAA, Cape Town, South Africa
 Display: Arkitema Architects and Professor Christoffer Harlang - Hammershus Visitor Centre, Allinge, Denmark
 Transport: Grimshaw - London Bridge station, London, United Kingdom
 Hotel & Leisure: SeARCH - Hotel Jakarta, Amsterdam, Netherlands
 Shopping: NIKKEN SEKKEI - Shanghai Greenland Center / Greenland Being Funny - Shanghai, China
 Health: Temporary association AAPROG – BOECKX. – B2Ai - Hospital AZ Zeno, Knokke, Belgium
 Mixed Use: WOHA Architects - Kampung Admiralty, Singapore, Singapore
 Religion: Spheron Architects - Belarusian Memorial Chapel, London, United Kingdom
 Higher Education & Research: Alison Brooks Architects - Exeter College Cohen Quadrangle, Oxford, United Kingdom
 Villa: KieranTimberlake - High Horse Ranch, Northern California, United States of America
 Future Buildings:
 Civic: BAAD Studio - The Sunken Shrine of Our Lady of Lourdes of Cabetican, Bacolor, Philippines
 Commercial Mixed-use: Aedas - Taichung Commercial Bank Headquarters Mixed-Use Project, Taiwan
 Competition Entries: Nextoffice - Sadra Civic Center, Sadra, Iran
 Culture: Studio 44 Architects - Museum of the siege of Leningrad, St. Petersburg, Russia
 Education: Warren and Mahoney Architects with Woods Bagot - Lincoln University and AgResearch Joint Facility, Christchurch, New Zealand
 Experimental : KANVA - Imago, Montreal, Canada
 Health : Allford Hall Monaghan Morris - The Alder Centre, Liverpool, United Kingdom
 House : Nextoffice - Guyim Vault House, Shiraz, Iran
 Infrastructure: Monk Mackenzie + Novare – Thiruvalluvar, Kanyakumari, India
 Leisure Led Development : BIG-Bjarke Ingels Group - Audemars Piguet Hôtel des Horlogers, Le Brassus, Switzerland
 Masterplanning : Sebastian Monsalve + Juan David Hoyos - Medellin River Parks / Botanical Park Master Plan, Medellin, Colombia
 Office: 3XN Architects - Olympic House - International Olympic Committee HQ, Lausanne, Switzerland
 Residential: Sordo Madaleno Arquitectos - Amelia Tulum, Tulum, Mexico

See also 
 List of World Architecture Festival winners

References

External links

 Official website - World Architecture Festival
 Official website - World Buildings Directory
 World Architecture Festival joins EMAP 16 October 2014

Architecture awards
Architecture festivals
Recurring events established in 2008
2008 establishments in Spain
Arts festivals in Spain
Arts festivals in Singapore